Ampasipotsy Gare is a town and commune in Madagascar. It belongs to the district of Moramanga, which is a part of Alaotra-Mangoro Region. The population of the commune was estimated to be 9023 in 2018.

Only primary schooling is available. 70% of the population of the commune are farmers, while an additional 1% receive their livelihood from raising livestock. The most important crop is rice, while other important products are cassava and sweet potatoes.  Services provide employment for 29% of the population.

Ampasimpotsy Gare is a railway station on the Antananarivo - East Coast line and is located at the RN 2 between Moramanga and Andasibe.

References and notes 

Populated places in Alaotra-Mangoro